The 16th Venice International Film Festival was held from 25 August to 10 September 1955. Film critic Mario Gromo was appointed as the President of the Jury. The Golden Lion was awarded to Ordet, directed by Carl Theodor Dreyer.

Jury
Main Competition (Venezia 16)
Mario Gromo, Italian journalist and film critic (Jury President)
Arthur Knight, American film critic and historian
Roger Manvell, British film historian
Piero Gadda Conti, Italian novelist and film critic
Domenico Meccoli, Italian journalist, film critic and screenwriter
Carlo Ludovico Ragghianti, Italian art critic and historian
Jacques Doniol-Valcroze, French actor, film director and critic
Antonín Martin Brousil, Czechoslovak film critic and historian
Emilio Lonero, Italian journalist and film critic

Official selection

In Competition
The following films were selected for the main international competition:

Highlighted title indicates Golden Lion winner.

Awards

Official selection
The following official awards were presented at the 15th edition:

In Competition
Golden Lion: Ordet by Carl Theodor Dreyer
Silver Lion:
The Grasshopper by Samson Samsonov
The Big Knife by Robert Aldrich
Le Amiche by Michelangelo Antonioni
Ciske the Rat by Wolfgang Staudte
Volpi Cup for Best Actor:
Kenneth More for The Deep Blue Sea
Curd Jürgens for Les héros sont fatigués

References

External links

Venice International Film Festival
Venice International Film Festival
Venice Film Festival
1950s in Venice
Venice International Film Festival
Venice International Film Festival